Bombardments of Tripoli:
Tripoli, Lebanon:
Fall of Tripoli (1289)
Tripoli, Libya
Siege of Tripoli (1551)
Bombardment of Tripoli (1728) - by Grandpré's French Navy squadron from 20 - 26 July, 1728.
First Barbary War (1804)
Aerial bombardment during the Italo-Turkish War (1911)
1986 United States bombing of Libya

See also
Bombing of Libya (disambiguation)